This is a list of agencies of Malaysian federal government. The list includes statutory bodies (ticked with *) government-linked companies and organisations (ticked with **).

Federal ministries 
The current Cabinet, formed on 2 December 2022, comprised the following federal ministries:

Prime Minister's Department (JPM)
Ministry of Agriculture and Food Security (MAFS)
Ministry of Communications and Digital (KKD)
Ministry of Defence (KEMENTAH/MINDEF)
Ministry of Domestic Trade and Cost of Living (KPDN)
Ministry of Economy
Ministry of Education (KPM/MOE)
Ministry of Entrepreneurship Development and Co-operatives (KUSKOP/MEDAC)
Ministry of Finance (MOF)
Ministry of Foreign Affairs (KLN/Wisma Putra)
Ministry of Health (KKM/MOH)
Ministry of Higher Education (KPT/MOHE)
Ministry of Home Affairs (KDN)
Ministry of Local Government Development (KPKT)
Ministry of Human Resources (KSM/MOHR)
Ministry of International Trade and Industry (MITI)
Ministry of National Unity (PERPADUAN/KPN)
Ministry of Natural Resources, Environment and Climate Change (NRECC)
Ministry of Plantation and Commodities (KPPK/MPIC)
Ministry of Rural and Regional Development (KKDW)
Ministry of Science, Technology and Innovation (MOSTI)
Ministry of Tourism, Arts and Culture (MOTAC)
Ministry of Transport (MOT)
Ministry of Women, Family and Community Development (KPWKM)
Ministry of Works (KKR)
Ministry of Youth and Sports (KBS)

Federal agencies

Prime Minister's Department 

Prime Minister's Department, having status of a ministry, comprises the following agencies:

 National Palace (Website)
 Prime Minister's Office (PMO) (Website)
 Deputy Prime Ministers' Office
 Chief Secretary's Office (Website)
 General Administration
 Advisory Board
 Attorney General's Chamber (AGC) (Website)
 Bumiputera Agenda Steering Unit (TERAJU)
 Cabinet, Constitution and Intergovernmental Affairs Division (BKPP)
 Community Communication Department (J-KOM)
Department of Statistics (DOSM)
 Division of Ceremonies and International Conferences Secretariat (BIUPA)
Development of Hawkers, Petty Traders and Hindu Endowment Unit (UPPPKWH)
Education Service Commission (SPP)
Election Commission (SPR)
Federal Territories Department (JWP)
Federal Territories' Sports Council (MSWP)
Labuan Corporation* (PL) (Website)
Kampong Bharu Development Corporation* (PKB)
Kuala Lumpur City Hall* (DBKL) (Website)
Office of the Director of Land and Mines of Federal Territories (PTGWP)
Putrajaya Corporation* (PPj) (Website)
Federal Territories Syariah Prosecution Department (JAPENSWP)
Implementation Coordination Unit (ICU)
Judicial Appointments Commission (JAC)
 Legal Affairs Division (BHEUU)
Legal Aid Department (JBG)
Malaysian Department of Insolvencies (MdI)
 Legal and Judicial Training Institute (ILKAP)
Malaysian Anti-Corruption Commission (SPRM)
Malaysian Civil Defence Force (APM) (Website)
 Malaysian Indian Transformation Unit (MITRA)
Malaysian Islamic Development Department (JAKIM)
Alhijrah Media Corporation** (TV Alhijrah) (Website)
Department of Waqf, Zakat and Hajj (JAWHAR)
Federal Territories' Islamic Affairs Department (JAWI)
Islamic Dakwah Foundation of Malaysia** (YADIM)
Islamic Economic Development Foundation of Malaysia** (YaPEIM)
Waqaf Foundation of Malaysia** (YWM)
Malaysian Maritime Enforcement Affairs Division (BHEPMM)
 Malaysian Syariah Judiciary Department (JKSM)
Federal Territories' Syariah Court (MSWP)
Sabah State Syariah Judiciary Department (JKSN Sabah)
National Audit Department (JAN)
National Disaster Management Agency (NADMA)
National Governance, Integrity and Anti-Corruption Centre (GIACC)
Enforcement Agency Integrity Commission (EAIC)
Malaysian Integrity Institute** (INTEGRITI)
National Anti-Financial Crime Centre (NFCC)
Public Complaints Bureau (BPA/PCB)
 National Security Council (MKN) (Website)
 National Cyber Security Agency (NACSA)
 Office of Sabah Federal Secretary (PSUP Sabah)
 Office of Sarawak Federal Secretary (PSUP Sarawak)
 Office of the Chief Government Security Officer (CGSO)
 Office of the Chief Registrar of the Federal Court (PKPMP)
 Office of the Former Prime Minister, Tun Dr. Mahathir Mohamad (Website)
 Office of the Former Prime Minister, Tun Abdullah Ahmad Badawi (PTAB) (Website)
 Office of the Former Prime Minister, Dato' Sri Mohd. Najib Abdul Razak
Office of the Former Prime Minister, Tan Sri Muhyiddin Yassin
Office of the Former Prime Minister, Dato' Sri Ismail Sabri Yaakob
 Office of the Keeper of the Rulers’ Seal (Website) (PMBRR)
 Office of the Mufti of Federal Territories (PMWP)
 Property Management Division (BPH)
 Protection Division
 Public-Private Partnership Unit (UKAS)
Public Services Commission (SPA)
 Public Service Department (JPA)
Malaysian Institute of Public Administration (INTAN)
 Research Division
 Sabah and Sarawak Affairs Division (BHESS)
 Secretariat of Federal Territories Earthworks Committee
 Shared Prosperity Delivery Unit (SEPADU)
 SME and Microcredit Development Unit
 Strategic Special Unit (UKS)
Federal Territories’ Islamic Affairs Council* (MAIWP)
MAIWP Zakat Collection Centre** (PPZ-MAIWP)
Human Rights Commission of Malaysia* (SUHAKAM)
National Innovation Agency* (AIM)
 Pilgrims Fund Board* (TH) (Website)
 Rulers’ and Governors’ Higher Education Scholarship Fund*
 Institute for Strategic and International Studies** (ISIS)
 International Multilateral Partnership Against Cyber Threats** (IMPACT) (Website)
 Kuala Lumpur Regional Centre for Arbitration** (KLRCA)
 Malaysian Family Foundation** (YKM)
Malaysian Islamic Understanding Institute** (IKIM)
National Legal Aid Foundation** (YBGK)
Amanah Raya Berhad** (ARB)
Bumiputera Education Steering Foundation** (YPPB)
Bumiputera Investment Foundation** (YPB)
Federal Land Combination and Recovery Authority** (FELCRA)
Federal Land Development Authority* (FELDA) (Website)
FGV Holdings Berhad**
FELDA Regulatory Division (BKSF)
Halal Industry Development Corporation** (HDC) (Website)
Iskandar Region Development Authority* (IRDA) (Website)
Langkawi Development Authority* (LADA)
Malaysian Industry-Government Group for High Technology** (MiGHT)
Pelaburan Hartanah Berhad** (PHB)
Perbadanan Usahawan Nasional Berhad** (PUNB)
Permodalan Nasional Berhad** (PNB) (Website)
 Petroliam Nasional Berhad** (PETRONAS) (Website)
 Teraju Bumiputera Corporation**

Ministry of Agriculture and Food Security 

This Ministry comprises the following agencies:

 Malaysian Agricultural Research and Development Institute** (MARDI) (Website)
 Farmers’ Organisation Authority* (LPP) (Website)
 Federal Agricultural Marketing Authority* (FAMA) (Website)
 Malaysian Fisheries Development Authority* (LKIM)
 Muda Agricultural Development Authority* (MADA)
 Malaysian Pineapple Industrial Authority* (MPIB)
 Kemubu Agricultural Development Authority* (KADA)
 Department of Agriculture (DOA)
 Department of Veterinary Service (DVS)
 Department of Fisheries (DOF)
 Malaysian Quarantine and Inspection Services (MAQIS)
 Agrobank**

Ministry of Communication and Digital 

The Ministry comprises the following agencies:
CyberSecurity Malaysia**
Department of Broadcasting (RTM) (Website)
 Department of Information (JAPEN)
 Department of Personal Data Protection (JPDP)
 Tun Abdul Razak Institute for Broadcasting and Information (IPPTAR)
Malaysian Administrative Modernisation and Management Planning Unit (MAMPU)
 Malaysian Communication and Multimedia Commission* (SKMM) (Website)
 Malaysian Digital Economy Corporation** (MDEC)
 Malaysian National News Agency* (BERNAMA) (Website)
 National Film Development Corporation* (FINAS)
 myNIC** (Website)

Ministry of Defence 

This Ministry comprises the following agencies:
 Malaysian Armed Forces (ATM) (Website)
 Armed Forces Retirees' Affairs Corporation* (PERHEBAT)
 ATM Veteran Affairs Department (JHEV)
 Malaysian Institute of Defence and Security (MIDAS)
 Science and Technology Research Institute for Defence (STRIDE)

Ministry of Domestic Trade and Costs of Living 

This Ministry comprises the following agencies:

Companies Commission (SSM) (Website)
Competition Commission (MyCC)
Malaysian Intellectual Property Corporation (MyIPO)
Perbadanan Nasional Berhad** (PNS)

Ministry of Economy 

This Ministry comprises the following agencies:

Economic Planning Unit (EPU)
Ekuiti Nasional Foundation** (YEN)
Malaysia Petroleum Resources Corporation Berhad (MPRC)
MyDiGITAL Corporation
Johor Petroleum Development Corporation (JPDC)
Sabah Economic Development Corporation (SEDCO)
Sarawak Economic Development Corpration (SEDC)
Johor Corporation (JCORP)
Perbadanan Kemajuan Negeri, Negeri Sembilan (PKNNS)
Perbadanan Kemajuan Negeri Melaka (PKNM)
Perbadanan Kemajuan Negeri Pahang (PKNP Pahang)
Perbadanan Memajukan Iktisad Negeri Terengganu (PMINT)
Perbadanan Kemajuan Iktisad Negeri Kelantan (PKINK)
Perbadanan Kemajuan Negeri Kedah (PKNK)
Perbadanan Kemajuan Ekonomi Negeri Perlis (PKENPS)
Perbadanan Kemajuan Negeri Selangor (PKNS)
Perbadanan Kemajuan Negeri Perak (PKNP Perak)
Penang Development Corporation (PDC)
Regional Corridor Development Authority* (RECODA)
Sabah Economic Development and Investment Authority* (SEDIA)
East Coast Economic Region Development Council* (ECER DC)
Northern Corridor Implementation Authority* (NCIA)
Iskandar Region Development Authority* (IRDA) (Website)

Ministry of Education 

This Ministry comprises the following agencies and includes educational institutions and Aminuddin Baki Institute (IAB):

Dewan Bahasa dan Pustaka* (DBP) (Website)
Malaysian Examination Council* (MPM)
 Malaysian Institute of Translation & Books** (ITBM)
Malaysian National Library (PNM)
 PADU Corporation**
National Archives of Malaysia (ANM) (Website)

Ministry of Entrepreneurship Development and Co-operatives 

This Ministry comprises the following agencies:

Co-operatives Commission (SKM)
Malaysian Co-operative College (MKM)
SME Corporation Malaysia* (SME Corp)
Small and Medium Entreprise Bank** (SME Bank)
TEKUN Nasional**
Uda Holdings Berhad
Bank Kerjasama Rakyat Malaysia Berhad** (Bank Rakyat) (Website)
Institut Keusahawanan Negara (INSKEN)
Professional Training & Education For Growing Entrepreneurs (Protege)
Malaysian Global Innovation & Creativity Centre (MAGIC)

Ministry of Finance 

This Ministry, including the Treasury, comprises the following agencies:

Accountant-General's Department (ANM)
Property Assessment and Services Department (JPPH)
Royal Malaysian Customs Department (JKDM) (Website)
Bank Simpanan Nasional* (BSN) (Website)
Central Bank of Malaysia* (BNM) (Website)
Employees’ Provident Fund* (KWSP/EPF) (Website)
Inland Revenue Board* (LHDN)
Khazanah Nasional Berhad** (Website)
Labuan Financial Services Authority* (Labuan FSA)
 Malaysian Totalisator Board*
Public Sector Housing Financing Authority* (LPPSA)
Retirement Fund (Incorporated)* (KWAP)
Securities Commission* (SC)
Bursa Malaysia Berhad** (Website)

Ministry of Foreign Affairs 

This Ministry comprises the following agencies and includes Malaysian foreign missions abroad:

ASEAN-Malaysia National Secretariat
Institute of Diplomacy and Foreign Relations (IDFR)
Southeast Asia Regional Centre for Counter Terrorism (SEARCCT)
National Authority for Chemical Weapons' Convention (NACWC)

Ministry of Health 

This Ministry comprises the following agencies and includes government hospitals, health centres, clinics and training centres:

Malaysian Healthcare Travel Council (MHTC)
Medical Device Authority (MDA)
Institute for Medical Research (IMR)
Institute for Health Systems Research (IHSR)
Institute for Public Health (IKU)
Institute for Health Management (IPK)
 Institute for Respiratory Medicine (IPR)
Clinical Research Centre (CRC)
Institute for Health Behavioural Research (IPTK)
National Cancer Institute (NCI)
National Blood Centre (PDN)
 National Leprosy Control Centre (PKKN)
Children’s Dental Centre

Ministry of Higher Education 

This Ministry with comprises the following agencies and includes educational institutions:

 Higher Education Department (JPT)
 Polytechnic and Community College Education Department (JPPKK)
 Malaysian Qualification Agency* (MQA)
National Higher Education Fund Corporation* (PTPTN) (Website)

Ministry of Home Affairs 

This Ministry comprises the following agencies:

Eastern Sabah Security Command (ESSCOM) (Website)
Fire and Rescue Department of Malaysia (JBPM) (Website)
Malaysian Immigration Department (JIM)
Malaysian Maritime Enforcement Agency (APMM) (Website)
Malaysian Prison Department (Website)
Malaysian Volunteers’ Department (RELA) (Website)
National Anti-Drug Agency (AADK)
National Registration Department (JPN)
Registry of Societies (ROS)
Royal Malaysian Police (PDRM) (Website)
Percetakan Nasional Malaysia Berhad** (PNMB)
Film Censorship Board of Malaysia (LPF) (Website)

Ministry of Local Government Development 

This Ministry comprises the following agencies:

Department of Local Governments (JKT)
Kampung Baru Division
National Landscape Department (JLN)
National Housing Corporation* (PRIMA)
National Housing Department (JPN)
National Solid Waste Management Department (JPSPN)
Urban and Rural Planning Department of Peninsular Malaysia (JPBD)
Housing and Local Government Training Institute (i-KPKT)
Solid Waste Management and Public Cleansing Corporation* (SWCorp)
Syarikat Perumahan Negara Berhad** (SPNB)
 Tribunal for Housing and Strata Management (TPPS)

Ministry of Human Resources 

This Ministry comprises the following agencies:

Department of Industrial Relations (JPP)
Department of Manpower (JTM)
Department of Occupational Safety and Health (JKKP/DOSH)
Department of Skills Development (JPK/DSD) (Website)
Department of Trade Union Affairs (JHEKS)
Industrial Courts (MP)
Sabah Labour Department (JTK Sabah)
Sarawak Labour Department (JTK Sarawak)
Human Resources Development Fund** (HRDF/PSMB)
National Institute of Occupational Safety and Health** (NIOSH)
Skill Development Fund Corporation (PTPK)
Social Security Organisation (PERKESO/SOCSO)
Talent Corporation Malaysia Berhad** (TalentCorp)

Ministry of International Trade and Industry 

This Ministry comprises the following agencies:

Malaysian Automotive Institute** (MAI)
Malaysian External Trade Development Corporation (MATRADE)
Malaysian Industrial Development Finance** (MIDF)
Malaysian Investment Development Authority (MIDA) (Website)
Malaysian Productivity Corporation (MPC)
Malaysian Steel Institute** (MSI)

Ministry of National Unity 

This Ministry comprises the following agencies:

 Department of National Unity and Integration (JPNIN)
 Department of Museums Malaysia (JMM)
National Archives of Malaysia (Arkib Negara)
National Library of Malaysia (PNM)
 Yayasan Tun Razak** (YTR)
 Yayasan Tunku Abdul Rahman*** (YTAR)
 Yayasan Sukarelawan Siswa*** (YSS)

Ministry of Natural Resources, Environment and Climate Change 

This Ministry comprises the following agencies:

 Atom Energy Licensing Board (LPTA/AELB)
 Department of the Director General of Land and Mines (JKPTG)
 Department of Environment (JAS/DOE)
 Department of Forestry of Peninsular Malaysia (JPSM)
 Department of Irrigation and Drainage (JPS/DID)
 Department of Marine Parks (JTLM/DMPM)
 Department of Mineral and Geoscience (JMG)
 Department of Water Supply (JBA)
 Department of Wildlife and National Parks Peninsular Malaysia (PERHILITAN) (Website)
 Malaysian Mapping and Survey Department (JUPEM)
 Malaysian Nuclear Agency (Nuclear Malaysia) (Website)
 Malaysian Sustainable Energy Development Authority (SEDA)
 National Hydraulic Research Institute of Malaysia (NAHRIM)
 National Land and Survey Institute (INSTUN)
 Sewerage Services Department (JPP)
 Energy Commission* (ST) (Website)
 Forestry Research Institute of Malaysia* (FRIM)
 National Water Services Commission* (SPAN)
 Malaysian Nuclear Power Corporation** (MNPC)
 Yayasan Hijau** (yaHijau)

Ministry of Plantation Industries and Commodities 

This Ministry comprises the following agencies:

Malaysian Cocoa Board* (LKM)
Malaysian Palm Oil Board* (MPOB)
Malaysian Pepper Board* (MPB)
Malaysian Rubber Board* (LGM)
Malaysian Timber Industries Board* (MTIB)
National Kenaf and Tobacco Board* (LKTN)
Malaysian Furniture Promotion Council** (MFPC)
Malaysian Palm Oil Certification Council** (MPOCC)
 Malaysian Palm Oil Council** (MPOC)
Malaysian Rubber Export Promotion Council** (MREPC)
Malaysian Timber Certification Council** (MTCC)
Malaysian Timber Council** (MTC)

Ministry of Rural and Regional Development 

This Ministry comprises the following agencies:

Community Development Department (KEMAS)
Indigenous Community Affairs Department (JAKOA)
Institute for Rural Advancement (INFRA)
Central Terengganu Development Authority* (KETENGAH)
Kedah Regional Development Authority* (KEDA)
Majlis Amanah Rakyat* (MARA) (Website)
Penang Regional Development Authority* (PERDA)
Rubber Industry Smallholders Development Authority* (RISDA) (Website)
South Kelantan Development Authority* (KESEDAR)
Southeast Johor Development Authority* (KEJORA)

Ministry of Science, Technology and Innovation 

This Ministry comprises the following agencies:

Department of Biosafety (JBK)
Malaysian Chemistry Department (JKM)
Malaysian Meteorological Department (MMD/MET Malaysia) (Website)
Malaysian Remote Sensing Agency (MRSA)
Malaysian Standards Department (JSM/Standards Malaysia)
National Science Centre (PSN)
National Space Agency (ANGKASA) (Website)
Academy of Science, Malaysia* (ASM)
Malaysian Board of Technologists* (MBOT)
 Malaysian Astronauts Foundation** (YAM)
Malaysian Foundation for Innovation** (YIM)
Malaysian Institute of Chemistry** (IKM)
Sultan Mizan Foundation for Antarctic Research** (YPASM)
Astronautic Technology Sdn. Bhd.** (ATSB) (Website)
Bioeconomy Corporation**
Inno Biologics Sdn. Bhd.**
Kumpulan Modal Perdana Sdn. Bhd.
Malaysia Debt Ventures Berhad** (MDV)
Malaysia Design Council** (MRM)
Malaysia Green Technology Corporation** (GreenTech Malaysia)
Malaysia Venture Capital** (MAVCAP)
Malaysian Technology Development Corporation** (MTDC)
National Institutes of Biotechnology Malaysia** (NIBM)
MIMOS Berhad** (Website)
NanoMalaysia Berhad**
SIRIM Berhad** (Website)
Technology Park Malaysia Corporation Sdn. Bhd.** (TPM) (Website)

Ministry of Tourism, Arts and Culture 

This Ministry comprises the following agencies:

Islamic Tourism Centre (ITC)
Istana Budaya (IB) (Website)
Malaysia Convention and Exhibition Bureau (MyCEB)
Malaysian Handicraft Development Corporation (PKKM)
National Culture and Art Department (JKKN)
National Culture, Art and Heritage Academy (ASWARA)
National Heritage Department (JWN)
National Visual Arts Development Board (LPSVN)
Tourism Malaysia* (Website)

Ministry of Transport 

This Ministry comprises the following agencies:

 Bintulu Port Authority (BPA)
 Civil Aviation Authority of Malaysia (CAAM) (Website)
 Johor Port Authority* (LPJ)
 Kuantan Port Authority* (LPKTN)
Land Public Transport Agency* (APAD) (Website)
Malaysian Institute of Road Safety Research (MIROS)
 Marine Department of Malaysia (JLM)
 Maritime Institute of Malaysia (MIMA)
 Penang Port Commission* (SPPP/PPC)
 Port Klang Authority* (PKA) (Website)
 Railway Assets Corporation* (PAK/RAC)
 Road Safety Department (JKJR) 
 Road Transport Department (JPJ) (Website)
Sabah Commercial Vehicles Licensing Board (LPKP Sabah)
Sarawak Commercial Vehicles Licensing Board (LPKP Sarawak)

Ministry of Women, Family and Community Development 

This Ministry comprises the following agencies:

 National Family and Community Development Board* (LPPKN)
 Community Welfare Department (JKM)
 NAM Institute for the Empowerment of Women (NIEW)
 Institute of Social, Malaysia (ISM)
 Women Development Department (JPW)

Ministry of Works 

This Ministry comprises the following agencies:

 Public Works Department (JKR)
 Construction Industry Development Board (CIDB)
 Malaysian Highway Board (LLM)
 Board of Engineers of Malaysia (BEM)
 Board of Architects, Malaysia (LAM)
 Board of Surveyors of Malaysia (LJT)

Ministry of Youth and Sports 

This Ministry comprises the following agencies and includes the Ministry training institutes:

 Anti-Doping Agency of Malaysia** (ADAMAS)
Civic and Citizenship Bureau (BTN)
 International Youth Centre** (IYC)
 Malaysian Stadium Corporation* (PSM)
 Malaysian Youth Development Research Institute (IPPBM)
National Service Training Department (JLKN)
 National Sports Council (MSN/NSC)
 National Sports Institute (ISN)
 National Youth and Sports Department (JBSN)
 Office of the Sports Commissioner (PPS)
 Registry of Youth Societies (ROY)
Sepang International Circuit Sdn. Bhd.** (SIC)
 Subang Golf Course Corporation** (SGCC)

References 

Government of Malaysia
Politics of Malaysia
Malaysia
Federal